Wanhua Group may refer to:
 Wanhua Group Corporation, Chinese government-owned company (as of 2008)
 Wanhua Chemical Group, co-founded by Wanhua Group Corporation in 1998, listed company since January 2001
 Wanhua Industrial Group, co-founded by Wanhua Group Corporation in October 2001, direct parent company of the listed company from 2001 to 2018, acquired and owned BorsodChem from 2011 to 2018, majority shareholder of Wanhua Energysave Science and Technical Group
 Wanhua Energysave Science and Technical Group. A unlisted public company

See also
 Media Chinese International, a listed company. The company also owned another listed company, known as One Media Group. ( or just )